Shilparamam Jathara is an arts and crafts village and all so Sculpture park located in Madhurawada, Visakhapatnam, India.
The village was conceived with an idea to create an environment for the preservation of traditional crafts. There are ethnic festivals round the year.

Shilparamam, a crafts village, started in the year 2009, is situated just about few kilometers from Visakhapatnam city. That's the main reason the state government established this platform.

Shilparamam is located in beautiful natural conditions area sculpted with woodwork, jewelry, clothes and local crafts of each region of the country. mostly they are rural artwork.

Main Attractions

Stalls
There are 36 stalls. Each stall provide variety of traditional produce.

Jogging Track
A jogging track also available and it is useful for morning walkers because it has a lush green environment.

Bird Enclosure
One of the major attractions is the Bird Enclosure with different type of birds, including Indian and international birds.

Amphitheatre 
Amphitheater has a total capacity of 1000 members. There are so many cultural activities conducted here.

Sculpture Park 
Sculpture Park is one of the main attraction with artists' handmade sculpture.

Night Bazaar
A recently started night bazaar allows visitors to shop for food and entertainment.

Photo gallery

References

External links

Museums in Andhra Pradesh
Tourist attractions in Visakhapatnam
Indian handicrafts
Buildings and structures in Visakhapatnam
2009 establishments in Andhra Pradesh
Museums established in 2009